The 6th International Gold Cup was a motor race, run to Formula One rules, held on 26 September 1959 at the Oulton Park Circuit, Cheshire. The race was run over 55 laps of the circuit, and was won by British driver Stirling Moss in a Cooper T51.

Results

References 

International Gold Cup
International Gold Cup
International Gold Cup